Sidney Thornton (September 2, 1954 – January 29, 2023) was an American professional football player who was selected by the Pittsburgh Steelers in the 2nd round (48th overall) of the 1977 NFL Draft. A 5'11", . running back from Northwestern State University in Louisiana, he played in 6 NFL seasons from 1977 to 1982 for the Steelers, winning two Super Bowl titles with the team.

Thornton returned to pro football in 1984, playing one season with the Oklahoma Outlaws and rushing for 288 yards on 101 carries (2.9 yard per carry average).

Thornton died on January 29, 2023, at the age of 68.

References

1954 births
2023 deaths
American football running backs
Northwestern State Demons football players
Pittsburgh Steelers players
Players of American football from New Orleans